I Marinella tragouda ke thimate (Greek: Η Μαρινέλλα τραγουδά και θυμάται) is the name of a live album by popular Greek singer Marinella. The concert was recorded at the Athens Concert Hall on 27 April 1998. It was released on 23 June 1998 in Greece by BMG Greece and it went platinum settling at 50,000 records sold.

Track listing

Disc 1
 "To minore tis avgis" (Το μινόρε της αυγής) – (Spyros Peristeris - Minoas Matsas) – 2:47
 "San magemeno to mialo mou" (Σαν μαγεμένο το μυαλό μου) – (Dimitris "Bayianteras" Gogos) – 1:20
 "Archontissa" (Αρχόντισσα) – (Vassilis Tsitsanis) – 0:53
 "Prin to charama monachos" (Πριν το χάραμα μονάχος) – (Giannis Papaioannou - Charalampos Vasiliadis) – 2:09
 "Etsi ine i zoi" (Έτσι είναι η ζωή) – (Kostas Giannidis - Dimitris Evaggelidis) – 2:03
 "Mia fora monacha zoume" (Μια φορά μονάχα ζούμε) – (Kostas Giannidis - Mimis Traiforos) – 2:28
 "Chtes to vrady onireftika" (Χθες το βράδυ ονειρεύτηκα) – (Kostas Giannidis - Dimitris Giannoukakis) – 2:58
 "As erchosoun gia ligo" (Ας ερχόσουν για λίγο) – (Michalis Souyioul - Mimis Traiforos) – 2:35
 "Ela gi' apopse" (Έλα γι' απόψε) – (Christos Cheropoulos) – 4:58
 "Tha 'thela na 'mouna ekeini p' agapas" (Θα 'θελα να 'μουνα εκείνη π' αγαπάς) – (Iraklis Theofanidis - Kostas Kofiniotis) – 2:05
 "Mono konta sou" (Μόνο κοντά σου) – (Takis Morakis - Kostas Kofiniotis) – 1:39
 "Tha 'rtho mia nichta me feggari" (Θα 'ρθω μια νύχτα με φεγγάρι) – (Kostas Giannidis - Kostas Rigopoulos) – 0:49
 "Xypna agapi mou" (Ξύπνα αγάπη μου) – (Kostas Giannidis) – 3:14
 "Irtha ki apopse sta skalopatia sou" (Ήρθα κι απόψε στα σκαλοπάτια σου) – (Giorgos Zampetas - Charalampos Vasiliadis - Nikos Mourkakos) – 3:02
 "Apopse fila me" (Απόψε φίλα με) – (Manolis Chiotis - Christos Kolokotronis) – 2:38
 "Agapi pou 'gines dikopo macheri" (Αγάπη που 'γινες δίκοπο μαχαίρι) – (Manos Hatzidakis - Ioanna Georgakopoulou - Michael Cacoyannis) – 3:07

Disc 2
 "Nichtose choris feggari" (Νύχτωσε χωρίς φεγγάρι) – (Apostolos Kaldaras) – 6:38
 "Otan tha lavis afto to gramma" (Όταν θα λάβεις αυτό το γράμμα) – (Giorgos Zampetas - Giorgos Mitsakis) – 2:35
 "To garsoni" (Το γκαρσόνι) – (Manolis Chiotis - Giorgos Economidis) – 3:36
 "Ama dite to feggari" (Άμα δείτε το φεγγάρι) – (Mimis Plessas - Lefteris Papadopoulos) – 1:15
 "Piretos" (Πυρετός) – (Akis Panou) – 1:18
 "Pali tha klapso" (Πάλι θα κλάψω) – (Nakis Petridis - Sevi Tiliakou) – 1:47
 "I andres den klene" (Οι άντρες δεν κλαίνε) – (Giorgos Katsaros - Pythagoras) – 2:43
 "Stalia – stalia" (Σταλιά – σταλιά) – (Giorgos Zampetas - Dionisis Tzefronis) – 3:15
 "Kamia fora" (Καμιά φορά) – (Giorgos Hadjinasios - Michalis Bourboulis) – 4:03
 "Anixe petra" (Άνοιξε πέτρα) – (Mimis Plessas - Lefteris Papadopoulos) – 4:47
 "Olos o kosmos is' esy" (Όλος ο κόσμος είσ' εσύ) – (Kostas Hatzis - Sotia Tsotou) – 2:24
 "S' agapo" (Σ' αγαπώ) – (Kostas Hatzis - Sotia Tsotou) – 4:06
 "Ki' ystera" (Κι ύστερα) – (Kostas Hatzis - Sotia Tsotou) – 1:56
 "Sinora i agapi den gnorizi" (Σύνορα η αγάπη δε γνωρίζει) – (Kostas Hatzis - Sotia Tsotou) – 2:42
 "I agapi ola ta ypomeni" (Η αγάπη όλα τα υπομένει) – (Kostas Hatzis - Sotia Tsotou) – 3:08
 "Opia ke na 'se" (Όποια και να 'σαι) – (Apostolos Kaldaras - Giorgos Samoladas) – 3:42
 "Kane ligaki ypomoni" (Κάνε λιγάκι υπομονή) – (Vassilis Tsitsanis) – 3:58

Music video 
 Medley ("Ama dite to feggari"/"Pali tha klapso"/"I andres den klene"/"San magemeno to mialo mou"/"I agapi ola ta ypomeni") - Director: Nikos Soulis

Personnel 
 Marinella – vocals
 Lambros Liavas – producer
 Yiannis Smyrneos – producer, recording engineer
 Kostas Klavvas – arranger
 Giorgos Niarchos – conductor
 Dinos Diamantopoulos – photographer
 Achilleas Haritos – make-up artist
 Konstantinos Savvakis – hair stylist
 Vaggelis Hatzis – hair stylist
 Thanos Spyropoulos – artwork

References

Greek-language albums
Marinella live albums
1998 live albums
Sony Music Greece live albums